David Campbell Cummings Jr. (June 23, 1861 – April 24, 1913) was an American Democratic politician who served as a member of the Virginia Senate, representing the state's 1st district. He was elected in 1911, defeating incumbent Republican Alanson T. Lincoln.

References

External links
 
 

1861 births
1913 deaths
Democratic Party Virginia state senators
Politicians from Abingdon, Virginia
20th-century American politicians